The 2018–19 Divizia A1 season was the 69th season of the Divizia A1, the highest professional volleyball league in Romania. CSM București was the defending champion. At the end of the season, Alba Blaj won their fourth title. Agroland Timișoara and Penicilina Iași were relegated.

Competition format
The competition format will be the same as in the previous season.

 12 teams played the regular season, consisting in a double-legged round robin format.
 At the end of the regular season, teams are split into two groups, one of them composed by the first six teams and the other one by the rest. In this second stage all points of the regular season are counted and the teams will face each other from its group twice.

Team changes 

Promoted from Divizia A2
 CSU Galați
CSU Oradea

Relegated to Divizia A2
 —

Excluded teams
CSU Oradea promoted to Divizia A1, but due to the lack of funds chose not to join the championship and enrolled again in the Divizia A2.

Medicina Târgu Mureș encountered financial problems and entered in a partnership with the newly founded CSM Târgu Mureș, becoming the women's volleyball section of the sports club. The team was enrolled in the Divizia A2.

Teams

Regular season table

Play-off

Play-out

References

External links
Official site of the Romanian Basketball Federation
Voleiromania.ro (Romanian)

2017-18
Romanian
2018 in women's volleyball
2019 in women's volleyball